Xanthobacter autotrophicus is a Gram-negative, aerobic, pleomorphic and nitrogen-fixing bacteria from the family of Xanthobacteraceae which has been isolated from black pool sludge in Germany. Xanthobacter autotrophicus can utilize 1,2-dichloroethane, methanol and propane.

Further reading

References

External links
Type strain of Xanthobacter autotrophicus at BacDive -  the Bacterial Diversity Metadatabase

Hyphomicrobiales
Bacteria described in 1978